Sitra Ahra is the fourteenth full-length musical album by Therion released on 17 September 2010 in Europe, and 26 October 2010 in North America. It is the first studio release since Gothic Kabbalah in 2007. The album title was announced on 4 February 2010. It refers to the Qliphoth of Qabalistic lore.

Track listing

Charts

Personnel
 Christofer Johnsson – guitar, keyboards
 Christian Vidal - guitar
 Nalle "Grizzly" Påhlsson – bass guitar
 Johan Koleberg – drums
 Thomas Vikström – vocals
 Snowy Shaw – vocals
 Lori Lewis – vocals
 Linnéa Vikström – vocals on "Sitra Ahra", "Kings of Edom", "Land of Canaan" and "Hellequin"
 Mika "Belfagor" Hakola (Ofermod, Nefandus) - harsh vocals on "Din"
 Petter Karlsson - vocals on "2012", writer of "Hellequin"
 Marcus Jupither - vocals on "Hellequin"
 Thomas Karlsson – lyrics
 Thomas Ewerhard – cover artwork

References

Therion (band) albums
Nuclear Blast albums
2010 albums